Figure imposée (Compulsory routine) is the fifth album by French rocker Alain Bashung, issued in 1983 on Philips Records.

Production 
The album was issued one year after Play blessures (Play harms) which was a commercial and, at first, critical failure, as well as his first and last collaboration with Serge Gainsbourg. Bashung enlisted young songwriter Pascal Jacquemin who wrote most of the lyrics (except "Imbécile" ("Dumb") written by Boris Bergman).

Commercial performance 
Figure imposée was a commercial failure as well.

Track listing 

The 1993 CD reissue had both "Lou ravi" and "Nuits Halloween" dropped, replaced by "Spiele Mich an die Wand" (Boris Bergman - Alain Bashung) and "White Spirit" (Jean Fauque - Alain Bashung), the mix of "Élégance" was replaced by its single mix, and the mix of "Imbécile" was replaced by a long version.

Singles 
 1983: Élégance / Horoscope
 1983: What's in a Bird / Hi !

References

1983 albums
Barclay (record label) albums
Alain Bashung albums